Filip Pejović (born 26 June 1982) is a Serbian former professional footballer who played as a defender.

A product of Mačva Šabac, Pejović spent over 25 years at the club, including both junior and senior days.

Career
Pejović started out at his hometown club Mačva Šabac. He was loaned to Radnički Stobex in the 2003–04 winter transfer window. In the 2007–08 winter break, Pejović moved abroad to France and joined CFA 2 side Trélissac. He returned to Mačva Šabac in the summer of 2008. In the 2016–17 season, Pejović captained the team that won promotion to the Serbian SuperLiga for the first time in history.

Statistics

Honours
 Serbian First League: 2016–17
 Serbian League West: 2013–14, 2015–16

References

External links
 Srbijafudbal profile
 
 
 

Association football defenders
Expatriate footballers in France
FK Mačva Šabac players
FK Radnički Klupci players
Serbian expatriate footballers
Serbian expatriate sportspeople in France
Serbian First League players
Serbian footballers
Serbian SuperLiga players
Sportspeople from Šabac
Trélissac FC players
1982 births
Living people